Ruth Smith may refer to:
Ruth Smith (artist) (1913–1958), Faroese painter
Ruth Smith (writer), 1996 winner of Rose Mary Crawshay Prize
Ruth P. Smith (1907–2010), American pro-choice and reproductive rights advocate
Ruth 'Rudi' Smith, character in Gavin & Stacey played by Sheridan Smith

See also
Ruth Smeeth (born 1979), British Labour Party MP